Tsabit District is a district of Adrar Province, Algeria. According to the 2008 census, it has a population of 17,207.

Communes
The district is further divided into 2 communes:
Tsabit
Sbaa

References

Districts of Adrar Province